Joshua Andrew Mayo (born 17 July 1987) is an American professional basketball player who last played for Napoli Basket of the Italian Lega Basket Serie A (LBA).

Professional career
May was selected for the BBL All-Star Game in two consecutive years, as he participated in 2017 and 2018.

On June 27, 2019, he has signed two-year deal with Varese of the LBA. Mayo signed with Napoli Basket on June 21, 2020.

On June 21, 2020, he signed a deal with Napoli Basket in of the Serie A2 Basket second tier Italian national competition. On October 22, 2021, he has parted ways related with family problems.

References

External links
 Basketball Champions League Profile
 
 UIC Flames bio
 Eurobasket.com Profile

1987 births
Living people
American expatriate basketball people in France
American expatriate basketball people in Germany
American expatriate basketball people in Italy
American expatriate basketball people in Latvia
American expatriate basketball people in Turkey
American expatriate basketball people in Ukraine
American men's basketball players
Basketball players from Indiana
BK Liepājas Lauvas players
Lega Basket Serie A players
MBC Mykolaiv players
Pallacanestro Varese players
Pallacanestro Virtus Roma players
People from Munster, Indiana
Point guards
Scafati Basket players
Sportspeople from the Chicago metropolitan area
Sutor Basket Montegranaro players
Telekom Baskets Bonn players
Torku Konyaspor B.K. players
UIC Flames men's basketball players
Napoli Basket players